Siemieniotka is a Silesian soup made of hemp seed, often eaten at the traditional Christmas Eve meal, Wigilia. The name of the dish comes from its main component, seeds (siemie).

The hemp seeds are cooked, separated from the shells, ground into paste and mixed with milk and honey (an alternative recipe in Polish).

See also

 Bhang
 Spiritual use of cannabis
 Thandai

References

German cuisine
Polish cuisine
Silesian cuisine
Soups
Christmas food
Cannabis foods